Umingmaktok (Inuinnaqtun: Umingmaktuuq, "he or she caught a muskox") is a now abandoned settlement located in Bathurst Inlet in the Kitikmeot of the Canadian territory of Nunavut. The community was previously known as Bay Chimo and the Inuit refer to the community as Umingmaktuuq ("like a musk ox").

The traditional language of the area was Inuinnaqtun and is written using the Latin alphabet rather than the syllabics of the Inuktitut writing system. Like Cambridge Bay, Bathurst Inlet and Kugluktuk syllabics are rarely seen and used mainly by the Government of Nunavut.

Situated at the site of a deserted Hudson's Bay Company post, the community was formed as an outpost camp by Inuit families that wanted to live a more traditional lifestyle. The area around Umingmaktuuq is said to be rich in wildlife such as the Arctic fox, fur seals, barren-ground caribou, Arctic char and muskox.

With less than two dozen residents, Umingmaktuuq was one of the smallest permanent non-military communities in Nunavut. At one time the community had a school that provided education up to Grade 6. Later, any students were flown to Cambridge Bay and returned to the community only for the summer and Christmas.

The community had no electricity other than that provided by portable generators, and communication with the outside world was by satellite phone. The only access to the community was by chartered aircraft, and the landing strip divided Umingmaktuuq in half. On one side was the old Hudson's Bay Company buildings and the Co-op store. On the other side was the main residential area.

Demographics 

In the 2021 Canadian census conducted by Statistics Canada, Umingmaktok had a population of 0, no change from its 2016 population.

See also
List of communities in Nunavut

References

Regional Analysis of the West Kitikmeot
Nunavut Handbook - Joe Otokiak
Office of the Languages Commissioner of Nunavut - PDF Dialect Map
Office of the Languages Commissioner of Nunavut - Writing systems

Further reading

 Lee, John. Wolverine Harvest and Carcass Collection Coppermine, Bay Chimo and Bathurst Inlet, 1992/93. Yellowknife, NWT: Dept. of Renewable Resources, Govt. of Northwest Territories, 1994.

External links
E-mail in Bay Chimo

Ghost towns in Nunavut
Road-inaccessible communities of Nunavut
Hudson's Bay Company trading posts in Nunavut